Bonny Kate is an unincorporated community in Knox County, in the U.S. state of Tennessee.

History
Bonny Kate was the nickname of the wife of John Sevier, first Governor of Tennessee.

References

Unincorporated communities in Knox County, Tennessee
Unincorporated communities in Tennessee